US Post Office-Little Falls is a historic post office building located at Little Falls in Herkimer County, New York, United States. It was built in 1907-1909 (with an addition in 1938-1940), and is one of a number of post offices in New York State designed by the Office of the Supervising Architect of the Treasury Department, James Knox Taylor.   It is a brick and granite structure, five bays wide, in the Beaux Arts style with a highly ornamented facade.

It was listed on the National Register of Historic Places in 1989.

References

Little Falls
Government buildings completed in 1909
Beaux-Arts architecture in New York (state)
Buildings and structures in Herkimer County, New York
National Register of Historic Places in Herkimer County, New York